David Winner may refer to:

 David Winner (author) (born 1956), English author and journalist
 David Winner (soccer) (born 1971), retired American soccer goalkeeper

See also
 Dave Winer